Robert Waldemar Huber (30 March 1878 – 25 November 1946) was a Finnish sport shooter, who competed in the 1912 and the 1924 Summer Olympics.

Shooting 

He won silver at the 1929 ISSF World Shooting Championships in the trap team event.

He won five Finnish national championship golds in shotgun events in 1927–1933.

Other 
Konrad Huber, who won bronze in the same shotgun team in 1924, was his brother. He was a member of the City Council of Helsinki in 1916–1918.

References

Sources
 

1878 births
1946 deaths
Finnish male sport shooters
Olympic shooters of Finland
Shooters at the 1912 Summer Olympics
Shooters at the 1924 Summer Olympics
Olympic bronze medalists for Finland
Trap and double trap shooters
Olympic medalists in shooting
Medalists at the 1924 Summer Olympics